The 1978 Volta a Catalunya was the 58th edition of the Volta a Catalunya cycle race and was held from 7 to 14 September 1978. The race started and finished in Sitges. The race was won by Francesco Moser of the  team.

General classification

References

1978
1978 in Catalonia
1978 in Spanish road cycling
September 1978 sports events in Europe